Battle of Kunduz may refer to:
 
Battle of Kunduz (2015)
Battle of Kunduz (2016)
Battle of Kunduz (2021)